Firuzabad (also Romanized as Fīrūzābād; also known as Fīrūzābād-e Yek) is a village in Tazeh Kand Rural District, Tazeh Kand District, Parsabad County, Ardabil Province, Iran. At the 2006 census, its population was 1,316, in 273 families.

References

External links
Firuzabad on Tageo

Towns and villages in Parsabad County